Jarosław Aleksander Kaczyński (born 18 June 1949) is a Polish politician who is currently serving as leader of the Law and Justice party (known by its Polish acronym PiS), which he co-founded in 2001 with his twin brother, Lech Kaczyński, who served as president of Poland until his death in 2010.
 
Running for PiS, he served as the prime minister of Poland from July 2006 to November 2007, while his brother was the president of Poland. After PiS's electoral defeat in 2007, Kaczyński was the main leader of the opposition during Civic Platform's governments. Following the death of his brother in a plane crash, Jarosław Kaczyński ran in the 2010 Polish presidential election losing to Bronisław Komorowski.

Since the 2015 victories of PiS, both in the presidential and parliamentary election, Kaczyński is considered to be the most important politician in Poland and one of the most influential European leaders. For this reason, in Poland he is called by some people the "Chief of State" (following the example of Józef Piłsudski). In 2020, he was designated as the Deputy Prime Minister of Poland with oversight over the defense, justice and interior ministries.

Early life
Kaczyński was born on 18 June 1949, the identical twin brother of Lech Kaczyński. They were born in Warsaw. His father was Rajmund Kaczyński (1922–2005), an engineer who served as a soldier in the Armia Krajowa in World War II, and his mother was Jadwiga Kaczyńska (1926–2013), a philologist at the Polish Academy of Sciences. As children, he starred with his brother in the 1962 Polish film The Two Who Stole the Moon, based on a popular children's story by Kornel Makuszyński. Kaczyński studied law at the Warsaw University's Faculty of Law and Administration, where in 1976 he obtained a Doctor of Law (LL.D.) degree after completing a dissertation titled "The role of collegial bodies in governing institutions of higher education" under the supervision of Stanisław Ehrlich.

Political career

1970s and 1980s
During the communist-era, Kaczyński worked for several opposition organizations including Workers' Defence Committee, Committee for Social Self-Defense, and the Solidarity trade union. Kaczyński was also the executive editor of the Tygodnik Solidarność weekly magazine from 1989 to 1991.

1990s 
In 1991, he created the conservative, Christian democratic Centre Agreement party and later became its chairman, remaining in the role until 1998. In the years 1991 to 1993 and since 1997, Kaczyński was a member of the Sejm. In the same year, he worked under direction of the president of Poland, Lech Wałęsa, as the head of his presidential chancellery. Wałęsa fired Kaczyński, who then led the protest movement against him.

2005 elections

Kaczyński was the Law and Justice prime ministerial candidate in the September 2005 Polish parliamentary election. However, when the party emerged as winner of the election, he pledged that he would not take the position, expecting that his nomination would reduce the chances of his brother Lech Kaczyński, who was a candidate for the October presidential election. Kazimierz Marcinkiewicz was appointed prime minister.

In the following months, he was a frontbench MP and the leader of his party. He was said to have an enormous influence on the prime minister's decision-making process. Kaczyński was described as the architect of the coalition with the populist Self-Defense of the Republic of Poland and the far-right League of Polish Families party.

Prime Minister: 2006–2007

Following reports of a rift between Kaczyński and Marcinkiewicz, the latter resigned on 7 July 2006. Kaczyński was appointed prime minister by his brother, the president, Lech Kaczyński, on 10 July, and sworn in on 14 July, following the formation of a cabinet and a confidence vote in the Sejm. They were the first pair of brothers in the world to serve as president and prime minister of a country and the only twin brothers to have done so. The following 15 months were erratic and not without controversy, Kaczyński initiated a nationwide program (Lustracja) which required thousands of public employees, teachers, and journalists to formally declare whether or not they had collaborated with the security services of the former communist regime.
In 2006, Kaczyński also established a Central Anticorruption Bureau (Polish: Centralne Biuro Antykorupcyjne) with far-reaching powers and was embroiled in a case relating to the suicide of Barbara Bilda who was under investigation for corruption. The government also modified Polish foreign relations relating to the European Union by adopting a more eurosceptical stance, where Polish governments had in the past adopted a very pro-European Union position.

At the request of his government, taxes were reduced.

2007 parliamentary election
Despite gaining votes, Law and Justice lost the parliamentary election on 21 October 2007, finishing a distant second behind the pro-European and liberal-conservative party Civic Platform. Kaczyński was succeeded as prime minister by Donald Tusk, but remained chairman of Law and Justice and became leader of the opposition.

2010 presidential election
Following the death of his brother, Jarosław announced that he would run for president against Bronisław Komorowski in the election held on 20 June 2010. Joanna Kluzik-Rostkowska ran his electoral campaign staff and the spokesperson was Paweł Poncyljusz. Kaczyński appeared to soften his image during the campaign in order to win centrist voters. The campaign's motto was Poland Comes First. He polled 36.5% of the vote in the first round, against the acting president Bronisław Komorowski's 41.5%. In the second round he lost with 47.0% of the vote to Komorowski's 53.0%.

After 2015

In order to win over moderate voters, rather than running as PiS's candidate for president or prime minister, Kaczyński put forward more moderate PiS members in the 2015 presidential and parliamentary elections. Andrzej Duda ran as PiS's presidential candidate, while Beata Szydło was its candidate for prime minister. PiS won both elections. In the parliamentary election, PiS became the first party to win an outright majority since the end of communism. But despite being a popular leader among PiS's base, he himself remains unpopular among the wider public, with some polls showing that more Poles think Kaczyński is not trustworthy compared to Duda or Szydło. In 2017, Politico described him as the de facto ruler of Poland and as one of the most influential politicians in Poland.

In 2020, Kaczyński became deputy prime minister in the Mateusz Morawiecki government. Kaczyński announced in mid-October 2021 that he would step down as the deputy prime minister at the beginning of 2022 in order to focus on his leadership of his party, and stepped down on 21 June 2022.

Political views

Kaczyński's project is said to consist of a "moral revolution" culminating in the creation of a "fourth republic" drawing a radical break from the compromises surrounding the fall of communism in Poland and reverting Poland back to its conservative, Roman Catholic roots and away from a multi-cultural styled Western European mainstream. In April 2016, he stated that he is not going to run for the office of President or Prime Minister of the Republic of Poland in the upcoming elections.

Drawing from his strong, uncompromising views (especially regarding parts of the political, cultural and media elite, which he sees as remnants or heirs of the former communist networks), Kaczyński is often labelled as "polarizing".

In recent years, he was also known as an activist for animal rights, and, among other things, undertook activities aimed at banning the breeding of fur animals.

A pejorative term for ideology of Jarosław Kaczyński used by some of his political opponents is "Kaczyzm".

Kaczyński is a eurosceptic, and he pejoratively stated that "Germany wants to turn the European Union into Fourth Reich".

LGBT views

On 21 September 2005, Kaczyński said that "homosexuals should not be isolated, however, they should not be school teachers for example. Active homosexuals surely not, in any case", but that they "should not be discriminated otherwise". He has also stated, "The affirmation of homosexuality will lead to the downfall of civilization. We can't agree to it". His brother Lech, while mayor of Warsaw, refused authorization for a gay pride march; declaring that it would be obscene and offensive to other people's religious beliefs. A Warsaw court later ruled that Kaczynski's actions were illegal. Kaczyński was quoted as saying, "I am not willing to meet perverts." On 30 August 2006, during a visit to the European Commission, Kaczyński, as the Prime Minister, stated that "people with such preferences have full rights in Poland, there is no tradition in Poland of persecuting such people". He also asked the President of the European Commission, Jose Manuel Barroso "not to believe in the myth of Poland as an anti-Semitic, homophobic and xenophobic country".

Kaczyński has been less harsh in his descriptions of the LGBT community. In one interview, he stated that he had always been "in favour of tolerance" and that "the issue of intolerance towards gay people had never been a Polish problem". He said he did not recall gay people being persecuted in the Polish People's Republic more severely than other minority groups and acknowledged that many eminent Polish celebrities and public figures of that era were widely known to be gay. Jarosław Kaczyński also remarked that there are a lot of gay clubs in Poland and that there is a substantial amount of gay press and literature. In another interview abroad, he invited the interviewer to Warsaw to visit one of the many gay clubs in the capital. He also confirmed that there are some gay people in his own party, but said they would rather not open their private lives to the public. In 2019, Kaczyński characterized the LGBT rights movement as a foreign import that threatens the Polish nation. He also stated that everyone must recognize Christianity and questioning the Roman Catholic Church in Poland as unpatriotic: "We are dealing with a direct attack on the family and children — the sexualization of children, that entire LGBT movement, gender. This is imported, but they today actually threaten our identity, our nation, its continuation and therefore the Polish state."

Controversies

Promotion of conspiracy theories

Christian Davies wrote for The Guardian in 2016, "With a penchant for conspiracy and a vituperative speaking style, Kaczyński routinely brands his opponents "gangsters", "cronies", and "reds". Before the parliamentary elections in October 2015, he claimed that migrants from the Middle East were bringing cholera and dysentery to Europe, risking the spread of "various parasites and protozoa". More recently, he implied that people demonstrating against the Law and Justice government were "the worst sort of Poles" – an epithet they have adopted as a badge of honour."

The "Powązki" and "Trójka" Scandal 

On 10 April 2020, on the anniversary of the Smolensk air disaster, Kaczyński and nine other people, standing close together, visited the grave of Kaczynski's mother and the symbolic grave of twin-brother Lech at Powązki Military Cemetery, though they were closed to the public due to COVID-19 pandemic restrictions. The Polish Police stated that the gathering in Powązki did not constitute a gathering in the sense of big gatherings forbidden in relation to the pandemic, this caused controversy and criticism. The former prime minister of Poland Leszek Miller described the gathering as showing contempt for ordinary people respecting the restrictions. In May, a Polish radio station Trójka (run by state-owned broadcaster Polskie Radio) was accused of censoring "Twój ból jest lepszy niż mój" ("Your Pain is Better Than Mine"), a song by Kazik Staszewski that is critical of Law and Justice.

The song was inspired by Kaczyński's actions and does not reference the party or Kaczyński by name. When "Twój ból jest lepszy niż mój" charted at number one on Trójka's weekly countdown on 15 May, the station subsequently suppressed the chart and all references to the song from its website. Station director Tomasz Kowalczewski accused the programme's host Marek Niedźwiecki of having rigged the chart in favour of Kazik's song. Bartosz Gil — who also works on the chart show — alleged that Kaczyński's claim was false, and accused him of specifically targeting the song. The following Sunday, Niedźwiecki announced his immediate resignation from the station, and also threatened legal action against the broadcaster for false claims of fraud. On 16 May, Polskie Radio music head Piotr Metz revealed that, after the chart show aired, Kowalczewski had ordered him via text message to remove "Twój ból jest lepszy niż mój" from the station's music library. Metz also resigned from the station. The station also faced threats of boycotts from members of the Polish music industry.

Honors
:
Title "Man of the Year" by the weekly magazine Gazeta Polska, thrice (2004, 2015, 2019)

Title "Man of the Year" by the weekly magazine Wprost, twice (2005, 2015)

Title "Man of the Year" by the Federation of Regional Associations of Municipalities and Powiats of the Republic of Poland (2005)

Title "Man of the Year 2014" by the Economic Forum (2015)

 Title "Man of Freedom" by the weekly magazine Sieci, twice (2016, 2021)

25th anniversary award of Gazeta Polska (2018)

:
 St. George's Order of Victory (2013)

:
 Order of Prince Yaroslav the Wise, 2nd class (2022)

Personal life 
The Security Service (SB) files described Kaczyński as "...being very uncertain about his fate. His appearance is careless. He claimed that he was not interested in material matters, women, e.g. he does not care about having a family in the future. He has a phlegmatic disposition, the appearance of a bookworm." Also, the files noted he would not agree to any cooperation with the SB.

Kaczyński lived with his ailing mother until her hospitalization. He owns no computer and is said to have opened his first bank account only in 2009. He has no spouse, partner or children, and he is a practicing Roman Catholic. Being a feline enthusiast, Kaczyński owns a cat.

In popular culture 
The main character of the political satire web series The Chairman's Ear, chairman Jarosław (depicted by series creator Robert Górski), is modeled on Kaczyński.

See also

Polish nationalism
List of Law and Justice politicians
Janina Goss

References

External links

  Official Website of Jarosław Kaczyński

|-

|-

|-

1949 births
Polish actor-politicians
Identical twin politicians
Law and Justice politicians
Centre Agreement politicians
Lawyers from Warsaw
Leaders of political parties
Living people
Members of the Senate of Poland 1989–1991
Members of the Polish Sejm 1991–1993
Members of the Polish Sejm 1997–2001
Members of the Polish Sejm 2001–2005
Members of the Polish Sejm 2005–2007
Members of the Polish Sejm 2007–2011
Members of the Polish Sejm 2011–2015
Members of the Polish Sejm 2015–2019
Members of the Polish Sejm 2019–2023
Movement for Reconstruction of Poland politicians
Male actors from Warsaw
Polish anti-communists
Polish male child actors
Polish Roman Catholics
Politicians from Warsaw
Candidates in the 2010 Polish presidential election
Prime Ministers of Poland
Solidarity (Polish trade union) activists
Polish twins
Academic staff of the University of Białystok
University of Warsaw alumni
Polish dissidents
Polish Round Table Talks participants
Right-wing populism in Poland
Recipients of St. George's Order of Victory
Recipients of the Order of Prince Yaroslav the Wise, 2nd class